Diaspidina is a subtribe of armored scale insects. It occurs mostly in the Americas and Africa, with a few species in tropical Asia.  In the Americas Pseudoparlatoria is the largest genus, with Diaspis second; in Africa Diaspis is the largest genus. The grouping identified by Balachowsky in 1954 as the subtribe Diaspidina, are now the tribe Diaspidini.

Anderson found the Diaspidina grouping to constitute a clade with core genera: Carulaspis, Diaspis and Epidiaspis. and one of three sister-clades in the Diaspidini, the other two being the Chionaspidina and the Fioriniina.

Genera

Bantudiaspis Hall, 1941
Carulaspis MacGillivray, 1921
Diaulacaspis Takahashi, 1942 included by Anderson in the Chionaspidina, and by Takagi in the Diaspidina.
Diaspidistis Hempel, 1900
Diaspis Costa, 1835
Epidiaspis Cockerell, 1902
Eucleaspis Munting, 1968
Geodiaspis Tippins & Howell, 1973
Incisaspis MacGillivray, 1921
Leptodiaspis Takagi, 2011
Malleolaspis Ferris, 1941
Mancaspis Ferris, 1941
Protargionia Leonardi, 1911
Pseudodiaspis Cockerell, 1899
Pseudoparlatoria Cockerell, 1892
Situlaspis MacGillivray, 1921
Thysanofiorinia Balachowsky, 1954 included by Anderson in the Fioriniina, and by Takagi in the Diaspidina.
Umbaspis MacGillivray, 1921
Yunnanaspis Young, 1986

Former genera
Alioides Brimblecombe, 1958
Imerinaspis Mamet, 1954
Parachionaspis MacGillivray, 1921
Pseudaulacaspis MacGillivray, 1921
Serrataspis Ferris, 1955
Takahashiaspis Takagi, 1960

See also
 Chionaspidina
 Fioriniina
 Protodiaspidina

References

Diaspidini